Wuppertal-Langerfeld station is a through station in the district of Langerfeld of the city of Wuppertal in the German state of North Rhine-Westphalia. The station was opened in 1948 on a section of the Elberfeld–Dortmund railway from Döppersberg, near the current Wuppertal Hauptbahnhof, to Schwelm that was opened by the Bergisch-Märkische Railway Company on 9 October 1847. It has two platform tracks and it is classified by Deutsche Bahn as a category 6 station.

The station is served by Rhine-Ruhr S-Bahn lines S 8 between Mönchengladbach and Hagen and S 9 between Recklinghausen and Hagen twice an hour (30 minutes alternatively).

It is also served by bus route 606 operated by Wuppertaler Stadtwerke every 60 minutes.

References

Rhine-Ruhr S-Bahn stations
S8 (Rhine-Ruhr S-Bahn)
S9 (Rhine-Ruhr S-Bahn)
Railway stations in Wuppertal
Railway stations in Germany opened in 1948